Péter II Erdődy (c. 1504–1567) (Erdődy: a Hungarian noble family in the Kingdom of Hungary and Croatia since the Middle Ages) was the Ban of Croatia from 1557 to 1567 and the founding member of the Croatian branch of the Erdődy noble family.

Péter was born around 1504. He was the son of Peter I Erdődy, the nephew of Tamás Bakócz. He succeeded the famous Nikola IV Zrinski as ban in 1557. He first gained notoriety with a series of military victories against the Ottoman Empire in 1552, including setting fire to Gradiška with Juraj Frankopan.

He was given the titles of Reichsgraf in 1565 and Reichsfürst in 1566 by Maximilian II. Because he died soon (one year) after that, the titles weren't nostrificated. The title of Reichsgraf was nostrificated in 1580 for his two sons Thomas II and Peter III by Rudolf II. But the title of Reichsfürst got forgotten.

He died in 1567 in Jastrebarsko. His first son Toma Erdődy later became ban as well.

See also
 List of Bans of Croatia

Sources 
 "Die Geschichte des Hauses Erdődy" ("The History of the Erdődy family") after Dr. Karl Giay which is attached to Gräfin Helene Erdődy's book "Erinnerungen" ("Memories"). Released 1929 by Amalthea-Verlag, Vienna

References 

Peter
Bans of Croatia
Counts of Croatia
16th-century Croatian nobility
1504 births
1567 deaths
16th-century Hungarian nobility